is a Japanese rugby union player who plays as a prop. He currently plays for Panasonic Wild Knights in Japan's domestic Top League. He represented the Sunwolves in the 2016 Super Rugby season.

References

1993 births
Living people
People from Fukuoka Prefecture
Sportspeople from Fukuoka Prefecture
Japanese rugby union players
Rugby union props
Sunwolves players
Saitama Wild Knights players